Jag kan se en ängel is a 1992 Wizex studio album. The album peaked at 41st position on the Swedish albums chart.

Track listing
Jag kan se en ängel (J.Thunqvist-K.Svemling)
Tycker om dig (Finalmente) (Rickygianco/PierettiSan Just(B.Lindeborg)
Lambeth Walk (N.gay-Kar De Mumma)
Beatrice (B.Andersson-B.Ulvaeus)
En man i kavaj (H.saffer/D.Stråhed)
Det faller ett regn (P.Sahlin)
Adjö min vän (Trad.arr D.Stråhed-R.Freij)
Hallå, hallå (M.Klaman-K.Almgren)
Doktorn (A.Fältskog-B.Carlgren)
Jag måste nå min ängel (Norell/Oson/Bard-J.Thunqvist)
Vi ska minnas Huckle Buck (P.Sahlin)
Hemlängtan (P.Knutsen/D.Stråhed)
En dans i mörkret med dej (J.Thunqvist/K.Svenling)
Jorden snurrar än (J.Thunqvist/K.Svenling)
Jag är fri (H.Saffer/U.Söderberg)
Drängavisan (Anton Persson)

Charts

References 

1992 albums
Wizex albums